Ozon Radio can refer to:
Ozon Radio (Montenegro)
Ozon Radio (Serbia)